Amalia Maria Lică (born 11 May 2009) is a Romanian rhythmic gymnast. She became the first junior European Champion for Romania winning gold with club in 2022.

Career 
Amalia made her international debut in 2021 when she participated in the Irina Deleanu Cup. In 2022 she became a junior, her first competition was the Grand Prix in Moscow where she won silver in team, and taking part in the International Sofia Tournament where she won silver with ribbon, then the Irina Deleanu Cup. In June she was selected for her first European Championships in Tel Aviv, Israel, winning silver in team with Christina Dragan, and an historical gold in the final of clubs being the first junior individual European Champion for Romania.

Achievements 

 First Romanian rhythmic gymnast to win a gold medal in an individual apparatus final at the European Championships.

Routine music information

References 

Living people
2009 births
Romanian rhythmic gymnasts
People from Bucharest
Sportspeople from Bucharest
Medalists at the Rhythmic Gymnastics European Championships